Desmond Cleary (8 July 1925 – 7 September 2005) was an Irish footballer. He competed in the men's tournament at the 1948 Summer Olympics.

References

External links
 
 

1925 births
2005 deaths
Republic of Ireland association footballers
Olympic footballers of Ireland
Footballers at the 1948 Summer Olympics
Association footballers from Dublin (city)
Association football forwards